There are three sporting events named the San Diego Open:
San Diego Open (golf) is a PGA Tour professional golf tournament played in the La Jolla, San Diego, California, United States
San Diego Open (tennis) is a tournament on the ATP Tour held at the Barnes Tennis Center in San Diego, California, United States
San Diego Open (LPGA Tour) is a former LPGA Tour golf tournament